Joseph Robert Kerrey (born August 27, 1943) is an American politician who served as the 35th governor of Nebraska from 1983 to 1987 and as a United States Senator from Nebraska from 1989 to 2001. Before entering politics, he served in the Vietnam War as a United States Navy SEAL officer and was awarded the Medal of Honor for heroism in combat.  During the action for which he was awarded the Medal of Honor, he was severely wounded, precluding further naval service.

Kerrey was a candidate for the Democratic presidential nomination in 1992. He retired from the Senate in 2000 and was replaced by former governor and fellow Democrat Ben Nelson. From 2001 to 2010, he served as president of The New School, a university in New York City. In May 2010, he was selected to become the head of the Motion Picture Association of America. The MPAA, however, could not reach an agreement with him and chose former Connecticut Senator Chris Dodd instead.

In 2012, Kerrey sought election to his old Senate seat to succeed retiring Democratic incumbent Ben Nelson. He lost to Republican nominee Deb Fischer.

In 2013, Kerrey joined the Carmen Group lobbying firm.

Kerrey is a co-chair for the advisory board of Issue One, an organization that describes its mission as "fighting for real solutions to the problem of money in politics". In 1987, Kerrey was elected to the Common Cause National Governing Board.

Early life and education
Kerrey was born in Lincoln, Nebraska on August 27, 1943, the son of Elinor Fern (née Gonder), a University of Nebraska instructor, and James Henry Kerrey, a builder and businessman. He attended the public schools of Lincoln and graduated from Lincoln Northeast High School in 1961. He went on to earn a Bachelor of Science degree in pharmacy from the University of Nebraska–Lincoln in 1966. Kerrey pledged Phi Gamma Delta fraternity, and during his senior year he was admitted into the Society of Innocents, the chancellor's senior honorary society of spirit boosters.

Military service
Kerrey served in the United States Navy as a SEAL officer during the Vietnam War. He completed Officer Candidate School in Newport, Rhode Island, in 1967. He then received assignment to Naval Amphibious Base Coronado and subsequently completed Basic Underwater Demolition/SEAL (BUD/S) training with class 42 in December 1967. He received direct assignment to SEAL Team ONE, a separate organization from the Underwater Demolition Teams to which new personnel were normally assigned. After extensive pre-deployment training, Kerrey deployed to the Republic of Vietnam as assistant platoon commander with Delta Platoon, SEAL Team ONE in January 1969. He was seriously wounded and lost the lower part of his right leg in combat on Hon Tre island near Nha Trang Bay on March 14, 1969. While suffering shrapnel wounds and blood loss, Kerrey organized his squad in a counterattack that killed or captured enemy Viet Cong. He was later medically discharged from the US Navy due to his wounds. On May 14, 1970, President Richard Nixon awarded Kerrey the Medal of Honor for his heroic actions.

Medal of Honor citation
His Medal of Honor citation reads:

Thanh Phong raid

In 2001, The New York Times Magazine and 60 Minutes II carried reports on an incident that occurred during Kerrey's Vietnam War service. On February 25, 1969, he led a Swift Boat raid on the isolated peasant village of Thanh Phong, Vietnam, targeting a Viet Cong leader who intelligence suggested would be present. The village was considered part of a free-fire zone by the U.S. military.

Kerrey's SEAL team first encountered a villager's house. Later, according to Kerrey, the team was shot at from the village and returned fire, only to find after the battle that some of the killed appeared to be under 18, clustered together in the center of the village. "The thing that I will remember until the day I die is walking in and finding, I don't know, 14 or so, I don't even know what the number was, women and children who were dead", Kerrey said in 1998. "I was expecting to find Viet Cong soldiers with weapons, dead. Instead I found women and children."

In contrast, Gerhard Klann, a member of Kerrey's SEAL team, gave a different version independently supported by a separate interview with Vietnamese woman Pham Tri Lanh. According to Klann, the team rounded up the women and children from hooches (shelters) and decided to "kill them and get out of there", for fear that they would alert enemy soldiers. Kerrey responded to Klann's account by stating "it's not my memory of it", and accused Klann of being jealous that Kerrey had not assisted him in obtaining a Medal of Honor for a later mission. Other members of Kerrey's SEAL team also "wholeheartedly" denied Klann's account.

Kerrey expressed anguish and guilt over the incident, saying: "You can never, can never get away from it. It darkens your day. I thought dying for your country was the worst thing that could happen to you, and I don't think it is. I think killing for your country can be a lot worse. Because that's the memory that haunts." He was awarded a Bronze Star for the raid on Thanh Phong. The citation for the medal reads, "The net result of his patrol was 21 Viet Cong killed, two hooches destroyed and two enemy weapons captured." A display at the War Remnants Museum in Ho Chi Minh City is based on the incident. It includes several photos and a drain pipe, which it describes as the place where three children hid before they were found and killed.

Business career
After his military service, Kerrey pursued a business career. From 1972 to 1982, he owned and operated Grandmother's Inc. a chain of restaurants known as Grandmother's Skillet. Another company, Kerrey Holdings, included several fitness centers and a bowling alley. After he ceded active management to his brother in law in 1983, the businesses grew to include 10 restaurants, three fitness centers, a bowling alley, and other enterprises. Kerrey's other ventures included trading in cattle futures and a partnership that invested in commercial real estate including shopping centers.

While engaged in his business career, Kerrey gained his initial political experience. These activities included working on  a 1971 voter registration drive with anti-war activist Allard K. Lowenstein. Kerrey also managed a friend's successful campaign for a seat in the state legislature. In addition, he served as a member of the city of Lincoln's Human Rights Commission.

Governor of Nebraska

In 1982, Kerrey ran for Governor of Nebraska; he easily won the Democratic nomination 71 percent to 29 over state senator George "Bill" Burrows, then achieved a narrow victory over incumbent Republican Charles Thone, 51 percent to 49. He served as one term, 1983 to 1987, and did not run for reelection in 1986. During his governorship, Kerry pursued policies including welfare reform, education reform, job training, and environmental conservation. Several of these programs became models for other states and the federal government.

In 1986, Kerry served as chair of the Midwestern Governors Association. As governor, he was known for his transparency and criticism of "politics as usual" obfuscating and clichés. He was the subject of nationwide news coverage in July 1986, when he ordered the Nebraska State Patrol to halt a train after the federal government failed to notify him of a rail shipment of nuclear waste that would pass through Nebraska, and directed the Nebraska Army National Guard to park a tank on the tracks at the Kansas-Nebraska border to ensure that the train did not proceed. After Kerrey's chief of staff and the head of the state patrol met with federal authorities in Kansas, the train was allowed to proceed, with representatives of the federal government agreeing to notify state officials of the dates, times and routes for similar trains in the future.

U.S. Senate

Elections

1988

In 1988, Kerrey ran for the U.S. Senate seat held by recently appointed incumbent Republican David Karnes. He won the Democratic primary with 92% of the vote. In the general election, he defeated Karnes 57%–42%.

1994

Kerrey won re-election to a second term defeating businesswoman Jan Stoney 55%–45%

2012

Kerrey ran again for his old Senate seat after the retirement of Incumbent Democratic Senator Ben Nelson  in 2012, but was defeated by Republican candidate State Senator Deb Fischer.

Tenure

Senator Kerrey was a member of the Agriculture Committee and the Finance Committee, and was a member of the Appropriations Committee from 1989 to 1996. He also served as vice chairman of the Intelligence Committee from 1995 to 1999. He was the chairman of the Democratic Senatorial Campaign Committee for the 104th Congress before retiring in 2001.

Kerrey voted for the Gramm–Leach–Bliley Act which repealed the Glass–Steagall Act in 1999, defending his position against opposition by stating, "The concerns that we will have a meltdown like 1929 are dramatically overblown". Most famously, Kerrey cast the deciding vote in favor of President Bill Clinton's 1993 budget plan.

9/11 Commission

After his retirement from the Senate, Kerrey served on the National Commission on Terrorist Attacks Upon the United States, commonly known as the 9/11 Commission. The commission was created by Congressional legislation to investigate the circumstances of the attacks on September 11, 2001, and to provide recommendations of actions that could help prevent future similar attacks. It was a bipartisan commission of five Democrats and five Republicans. The commission issued its final report, the 9/11 Commission Report on July 22, 2004.

Kerrey criticized the 2014 Senate Intelligence Committee report on CIA torture as "unfair" and "partisan".

1992 presidential election

In September 1991, Kerrey announced his candidacy for the 1992 Democratic nomination for president.  In a small field of five second-tier candidates devoid of an early frontrunner, Kerrey was seen as the early favorite. However, his performance on the campaign trail sometimes seemed lackluster, especially in comparison to that of Arkansas governor Bill Clinton.

Kerrey finished third in the New Hampshire primary in February 1992, despite spending heavily on television advertising.  He briefly rebounded after winning the South Dakota primary but soon dropped out of the race after finishing fourth in the Colorado primary. Kerrey was on Clinton's "short list" of vice presidential candidates, but Tennessee Senator Al Gore received the nod instead.

The New School

Kerrey served as President of the New School from 2001 to 2010. During this time he more than doubled the endowment, taking it from $94 million in 2001 to $206 million. He also secured substantial federal funding for the school. Both of these factors helped the New School accomplish major academic growth and expansion in the decade that Kerrey was president.

Kerrey presided over an ambitious program of academic development at the university. Under his leadership, the university launched numerous new academic programs, including several joint degree programs. Enrollment increased by 44% to over 10,200, and online course enrollment doubled. He also oversaw an increase in the size of the faculty. The number of full-time faculty members grew from 156 in 2001 to more than 372 in 2009. He also helped to establish the Faculty Senate, which allowed the school to set university-wide standards for promotion, hiring, and faculty evaluation. Additionally, tenure was instituted for all academic departments.

On April 14, 2005, Kerrey announced that the university was changing its name from "New School University" to "The New School", and rebranding its eight divisions as specialized, separate entities serving different constituencies.

On April 17, 2005, a week after accepting a position as head of Democrats for Bloomberg in support of Michael Bloomberg's re-election as Mayor of New York City, Kerrey publicly stated that he was considering running against Bloomberg in the 2005 New York City mayoral election. Three days after announcing his interest, Kerrey announced that he would not run for Mayor, focusing instead on his position as President of the New School.

On December 10, 2008, it was announced that Kerrey had received a vote of no confidence from the university's senior faculty. This was perceived to have come as a response to his management style. The no-confidence vote was largely a symbolic gesture. The Board of Trustees offered their unanimous support for Kerrey at a meeting following the faculty vote.

On December 16, 2008, dozens of students took over the cafeteria in the 65 5th Avenue building; as the occupation continued, the group grew into hundreds of students from the New School, other New York City based universities, labor union members, and other supporters. Initially, the students stated that they would not leave the building unless several school officials resigned. Kerrey attempted to have a discussion with the students at the beginning of the occupation, but the students voted down that option. The occupation ended after 30 hours when the two parties accepted a treaty; Kerrey agreed to amnesty for the students involved in the occupation, more student space, and more student input in school investments and decision making.

Early in the morning of April 10, 2009, 19 students took over the 65 5th Avenue building, erecting an anarchist flag and demanding once again that Kerrey resign. A few hours later, about 20 police officers entered the building, arresting 22 students and ending the occupation after five hours.

In December 2012, the Chronicle of Higher Education reported that in 2010, the year of his anticipated departure, his salary was more than $600,000, and his total take-home pay, including bonuses, deferred compensation and nontaxable benefits, was $3,047,703, making Kerrey the highest-paid private college president in the United States.

Kerrey's time as president concluded on January 1, 2011. He was succeeded by David E. Van Zandt. Kerrey was then appointed President Emeritus.

Fulbright University Vietnam

While visiting Vietnam in May 2016, then Secretary of State John Kerry announced that the United States had appointed Kerrey to be chairman of the Board of Trustees of Fulbright University Vietnam.  This announcement unleashed a heated controversy, in view of Kerrey's role in the Thạnh Phong massacre of 1969.

Outspoken Vietnamese critics of the appointment of Kerrey included Tôn Nữ Thị Ninh, a former ambassador to the European Union, and the award-winning Vietnamese-American author Viet Thanh Nguyen. On the other hand, Kerrey's appointment was endorsed by Đinh La Thăng, who at that time was Communist Party Secretary of Ho Chi Minh City and a member of the Politburo, but in January 2018 was tried, convicted, and sentenced to 13 years in prison on corruption charges.

In May 2018, H. Kim Bottomly, former president of Wellesley College, was appointed to succeed Kerrey.

Return to politics

2012 U.S. Senate election

On December 27, 2011, Political Wire reported that Ben Nelson, who had succeeded Kerrey in the Senate, would not seek re-election, and asserted that Kerrey was in talks with senior Democrats about the possibility of replacing him. The Washington Post reported that Kerrey would neither confirm nor deny the rumor. American Crossroads had been running advertisements critical of Kerrey's potential Nebraska Senate run, focusing on the fact that Kerrey had been living in New York for the last ten years. Kerrey responded to the ads with an invitation for Karl Rove to eat at one of Kerrey's restaurants in Nebraska, or to work out at one of his gyms that he owns in that state. On February 27, 2012, The Washington Post reported that Kerrey had earlier decided against a run, but that an aide had confirmed that he was now filing to seek election to his old Senate seat. He won the May 15 Democratic primary against four minor candidates. However, he was defeated on November 6 by Republican state senator Deb Fischer. Kerrey narrowly won the state's two largest counties, Douglas and Lancaster—home to Omaha and Lincoln, respectively—but only won three other counties. His margin in Omaha and Lincoln was not nearly enough to overcome Fischer's margin in the more rural parts of the state.

Circinus
Kerrey works closely as an advisor to Elliott Broidy's firm Circinus, a paramilitary firm Broidy purchased in 2014 which has large contracts with the United Arab Emirates.

Personal life

While he was Governor of Nebraska, Kerrey dated actress Debra Winger while the latter was in Lincoln filming Terms of Endearment (part of which is set in Nebraska), which won the 1983 Oscar for Best Picture. When confronted with intense questioning by the press over the nature of the relationship, Kerrey famously replied; "What can I sayshe swept me off my foot", alluding to the fact that the lower part of one of his legs was amputated because of injuries sustained in his Medal of Honor action in Vietnam.

Kerrey is friends with fellow Vietnam veteran Jim Webb. In 2006 he became involved in convincing Webb to run for the US Senate. Webb entered the Virginia Democratic Primary, and Kerrey volunteered to serve as Webb's National Finance Chair. Webb went on to win the extremely close election in Virginia, defeating George Allen. Kerrey has also endorsed and appeared at campaign events for, Al Franken in his bid for the U.S. Senate in Minnesota.

Kerrey married Sarah Paley in 2001. They have a son, Henry. He has two children from his previous marriage: Ben and Lindsey. He has multiple grandchildren, including Will, Evelyn, and Thomas Kerrey. 

A 2012 The New York Times op-ed by columnist Frank Bruni states that Kerrey describes himself as an agnostic.

On September 9, 2008, a pedestrian bridge connecting Omaha, Nebraska with Council Bluffs, Iowa was named in Kerrey's honor by the Omaha City Council.

In 2011, Kerrey was awarded an Honorary Doctorate from The New School.

In 2016, Kerrey received an honorary doctorate and delivered the postgraduate commencement address for Southern New Hampshire University.

Awards and decorations

Medals and ribbons

See also

List of Medal of Honor recipients for the Vietnam War
Bob Kerrey Pedestrian Bridge

Notes

References

  by Gregory L. Vistica, New York Times Magazine, April 25, 2001

Clinton, Bill (2005). My Life. Vintage. .

Further reading
Kerrey, Robert. When I Was a Young Man: A Memoir. New York: Harcourt, Inc., 2002.
Vistica, Gregory L. The Education of Lieutenant Kerrey. New York: Thomas Dunne Books, 2003.

External links
 

|-

|-

|-

|-

|-

|-

1943 births
Living people
20th-century American politicians
American amputees
American agnostics
United States Navy personnel of the Vietnam War
American politicians with disabilities
Democratic Party governors of Nebraska
Democratic Party United States senators from Nebraska
United States Navy Medal of Honor recipients
Politicians from Lincoln, Nebraska
Politicians from New York City
United Church of Christ members
United States Navy officers
United States Navy SEALs personnel
Candidates in the 1992 United States presidential election
Lincoln Northeast High School alumni
University of Nebraska–Lincoln alumni
Vietnam War recipients of the Medal of Honor
Military personnel from Nebraska